Andrea di Leone (1610–1685) was an Italian painter of the Baroque period, active in his native city of Naples.

He was a pupil of Belisario Corenzio and Salvator Rosa. When Corenzio left Naples, Leone became his successor in his work for the palace of the Viceroy. He painted there several battle scenes, but afterwards imitated Aniello Falcone in this line of work. There are several paintings by him in the cathedral and in San Paolo Maggiore at Milan. He died at Naples.

Gallery

References

Other projects

1596 births
1675 deaths
17th-century Italian painters
Italian male painters
Italian Baroque painters
Painters from Naples
Italian battle painters